APOEL Futsal is a professional futsal team based in the city of Nicosia, Cyprus and it is a part of the APOEL multi-sport club. APOEL is one of the most successful futsal clubs in Cyprus with an overall tally of  6 Championships, 3 Cups and 1 Super Cup.

History
APOEL's futsal team was formed in 2012 as APOEL City Futsal F.S.C., after APOEL board came to an agreement with City Futsal F.S.C. to take their place in the Cypriot First Division for the 2012–13 season. The team had a successful first season, finishing fourth in the league and reaching the semi-finals of the cup. One year after its establishment, the club was renamed to APOEL.

In the 2013–14 season, the team achieved their first domestic double, winning both the season's Cypriot First Division and the Cypriot Cup, their first two major trophies after only two years of existence as a futsal club. The next season (2014–15), APOEL became double winners for second year in a row, after winning again the Cypriot First Division and the Cypriot Cup. During the 2015–16 season, APOEL achieved a historical domestic treble by winning all the Cypriot competitions trophies, the league, the cup and the super cup.

European campaigns
After winning the double in the 2013–14 season, APOEL qualified for the first time for the European competitions, participating in the 2014–15 UEFA Futsal Cup. They entered the preliminary round of the competition and they hosted all the Group D matches in Nicosia's Tasos Papadopoulos - Eleftheria Indoor Hall. APOEL managed to qualify for the main round by winning all their matches, beating FC Anzhi Tallinn 5–3, KF Flamurtari Vlorë 9–1 and NAFI Stuttgart 10–1. APOEL were eventually eliminated at the main round of the UEFA Futsal Cup, finishing in the third place of Group 6 with 4 points, after losing 1–5 against Slov-Matic Bratislava, beating MVFC Berettjóújfalu 3–2 and drawing 3–3 with Vegakameratene.

In the 2016–17 season, APOEL participated for the third consecutive time in the UEFA Futsal Cup. They entered the preliminary round of the competition and they managed to qualify for the main round by winning AFM Maniacs 9–7, JB Gentofte 4–3 and drawing 7–7 with the hosts ASUE Yerevan. APOEL were eventually eliminated at the main round of the UEFA Futsal Cup, finishing in the third place of Group 6 with 4 points, after drawing 3–3 with City'US Târgu Mureș, losing 0–7 against Era-Pack Chrudim and beating 6–5 ŠK Pinerola Bratislava.

Current squad
The following players played the 2021–22 UEFA Futsal Champions League.

Technical and medical staff

League and Cup history
 R16 = Last 16, QF = Quarter-finals, SF = Semi-finals, RU = Runners-up, W = Winners .

Honours
 Cypriot Championship
 Winners (6): 2013–14, 2014–15, 2015–16, 2017–18, 2020–21, 2021-22

 Cypriot Cup
 Winners (4): 2013–14, 2014–15, 2015–16, 2021-22

 Cypriot Super Cup
 Winners (1): 2015

European competitions record
Last update: 24 August 2021

Matches
 P = Preliminary round, M = Main round, E = Elite round, FF = Final Four, F = Final

References

External links
 APOEL Athletic Football Club - official website 

Futsal
Futsal clubs in Cyprus
Futsal clubs established in 2012
2012 establishments in Cyprus